Silvija Pacevičienė (née Latožaitė; born 20 November 1993) is a Lithuanian racing cyclist, who most recently rode for UCI Women's Continental Team . She competed in the 2013 UCI women's road race in Florence.

Major results
Source: 

2011
 10th Road race, UCI Junior Road World Championships
2015
 2nd Time trial, National Road Championships
2016
 National Road Championships
2nd Road race
3rd Time trial
2018
 3rd Time trial, National Road Championships
2019
 National Road Championships
1st  Road race
2nd Time trial

References

External links

1993 births
Living people
Lithuanian female cyclists
Place of birth missing (living people)
Cyclists at the 2019 European Games
European Games competitors for Lithuania